James Hayden Montgomery (born 20 April 1994) is an English professional footballer who plays as a goalkeeper for  club Gateshead.

Early and personal life
Born in Sunderland, his grandfather was a cousin of footballer Jimmy Montgomery.

Career
Montgomery began his career playing youth football for Middlesbrough. He then played in non-league with Guiseley, before attending the Nike Football Academy and signing with AFC Telford United in 2015. He moved to Gateshead in January 2017. Montgomery signed a two-year contract with Forest Green Rovers in May 2018. He made his professional debut on 14 August 2018, in the EFL Cup. During a match against Mansfield Town in January 2019, Montgomery collided with opposition player Gethin Jones, resulting in a cut lip and lost teeth. Montgomery was substituted by Lewis Ward.

In July 2019, Montgomery joined AFC Fylde on a two-year deal. He was released by the club in August 2020.

He returned to Gateshead in October 2020.

On 2 March 2021, Montgomery joined League Two side Southend United on an emergency seven-day loan following an injury to fellow goalkeeper Alex Bass. On 9 March 2021, the loan was extended for a further seven days.

On 15 April 2021, Montgomery joined National League side Chesterfield on a short-term deal. Montgomery's contract was not extended at the end of the season.

On 17 March 2022, Montgomery returned to former club Gateshead on a short-term contract. This would be his third spell at the National League North club.

Career statistics

References

1994 births
Living people
English footballers
Middlesbrough F.C. players
Guiseley A.F.C. players
AFC Telford United players
Gateshead F.C. players
Forest Green Rovers F.C. players
AFC Fylde players
Southend United F.C. players
Chesterfield F.C. players
Association football goalkeepers
English Football League players
National League (English football) players